Barwala is a village located in the Ludhiana East tehsil, of Ludhiana district, Punjab.

Administration
The village is administrated by a Sarpanch who is an elected representative of village as per constitution of India and Panchayati raj (India).

Child Sex Ratio details
The village population of children with an age group from 0-6 is 274 which makes up 11.44% of total population of village. The child Sex Ratio as per census is  877, higher  than  average of 846 in the state of Punjab.

Cast
The village  constitutes  47.47% of Schedule Caste  and the village  doesn't have any Schedule Tribe population.

External links
  Villages in Ludhiana East Tehsil

References

Villages in Ludhiana East tehsil